Ilya Sergeyevich Setov (born 3 August 1994) is a former Russian football midfielder.

Club career
He made his debut in the Russian Football National League for FC Baltika Kaliningrad on 10 November 2013 in a game against FC Neftekhimik Nizhnekamsk.

References

External links
 
 
 Career summary by sportbox.ru

1994 births
Sportspeople from Kaliningrad
Living people
Russian footballers
FC Baltika Kaliningrad players
FC SKA Rostov-on-Don players
Association football midfielders
FC Baikal Irkutsk players